Edith Rogers (née Nourse; March 19, 1881 – September 10, 1960) was an American social welfare volunteer and politician who served in the United States Congress. She was the first woman elected to Congress from Massachusetts. Until 2012, she was the longest serving Congresswoman and was the longest serving female Representative until 2018 (a record now held by Marcy Kaptur). In her 35 years in the House of Representatives she was a powerful voice for veterans and sponsored seminal legislation, including the Servicemen's Readjustment Act of 1944 (commonly known as the G.I. Bill), which provided educational and financial benefits for veterans returning home from World War II, the 1942 bill that created the Women's Army Auxiliary Corps (WAAC), and the 1943 bill that created the Women's Army Corps (WAC). She was also instrumental in bringing federal appropriations to her constituency, Massachusetts's 5th congressional district. Her love and devotion to veterans and their complex needs upon returning to civilian life is represented by the Edith Nourse Rogers Memorial Veterans Hospital in Bedford Massachusetts that is named in her honor.

Early life
Edith Nourse was born on March 19, 1881, in Saco, Maine, to Franklin T. Nourse, the manager of a textile mill, and Edith France Riversmith, who volunteered with the Christian church and social causes. Both parents were from old New England families, and were able to have their daughter privately tutored until she was fourteen. Edith Nourse then attended and graduated from Rogers Hall School, a private boarding school for girls in Lowell, Massachusetts, and then Madame Julien's School, a finishing school at Neuilly near Paris, France.

Like her mother, she volunteered with the church and other charities. In 1907, she married John Jacob Rogers, newly graduated from Harvard Law School, who passed the bar and began practicing in Lowell in the same year. In 1911, he started his career in politics, becoming involved in the city government, and the next year he became the school commissioner. In 1912 he was elected as a Republican to the 63rd United States Congress as the Representative from the 5th District of Massachusetts, and began service in Washington, D.C. on March 13, 1913.

World War I soon broke out. In 1917, John Rogers, as a member of the House Foreign Affairs Committee, traveled to the United Kingdom and France to observe the conditions of the war firsthand. He remained a Congressman during his brief enlistment as a private in an artillery training battalion, the 29th Training Battery, 10th Training Battalion, Field Artillery, Fourth Central Officers' Training School from September 2, 1918, until his honorable discharge on November 29, 1918.

During this period, Edith Rogers volunteered with the Young Men's Christian Association (YMCA) in London for a short time, then from 1917 to 1922 as a "Gray Lady" with the American Red Cross in France and with the Walter Reed Army Medical Center in Washington, D.C. This was the start of what became a lifelong commitment to veterans. She also witnessed the conditions faced by women employees and volunteers working with the United States armed forces; with the exception of a few nurses, they were civilians, and received no benefits including no housing, no food, no insurance, no medical care, no legal protection, no pensions, and no compensation for their families in cases of death. In contrast, the women in the British Army loaned to the American Expeditionary Force (AEF) in France were military, with the attendant benefits and responsibilities.

At the end of the war, her husband joined the American Legion veteran's organization, and she joined the auxiliary. Her experience with veteran's issues led President Warren G. Harding to appoint her as the inspector of new veterans' hospitals from 1922 to 1923, for $1 USD a year. She reported on conditions and her appointment was renewed by both the Coolidge and Hoover administrations. Her first experience in politics was serving as an elector in the U.S. Electoral College during Calvin Coolidge's 1924 presidential campaign.

Congresswoman

This experience served her well when her husband died on March 28, 1925, in the middle of his seventh term in Washington, D.C. Spurred by pressure from the Republican Party and the American Legion who approved of her stance on veteran's issues and wanted the sympathy vote, she was urged to run for her late husband's seat. She ran in a special election as the Republican candidate for Representative to the 69th United States Congress from the 5th District of Massachusetts, and beat Eugene Foss, the former Governor of Massachusetts, with a landslide 72 percent of the vote. Like Mae Ella Nolan and Florence Prag Kahn before her, she won her husband's seat.

Her term started on June 30, 1925, making her the sixth woman elected to Congress, after Jeannette Rankin, Alice Mary Robertson, Winnifred Sprague Mason Huck, Mae Nolan, Florence Kahn, and Mary Teresa Norton. Like all but Norton, Rogers was a Republican, and like them all she was a member of the House of Representatives; Hattie Wyatt Caraway would become the first woman elected to the Senate in 1932. Rogers was also the first woman elected to Congress from New England, and the second from an Eastern state after Norton, who was from New Jersey.

After her election to the 69th Congress, Rogers was reelected to the 70th, 71st, 72nd, 73rd, 74th, 75th, 76th, 77th, 78th, 79th, 80th, 81st, 82nd, 83rd, 84th, 85th, and 86th Congresses. She continued to win with strong majorities, serving a total of 35 years and 18 consecutive terms, until her death on September 10, 1960. She was considered a formidable candidate for U.S. Senate in 1958 against the much younger John F. Kennedy, but decided not to run. This was the longest tenure of any woman elected to the United States Congress, until surpassed by Barbara Mikulski in 2012. Like her husband, she served on the Foreign Affairs Committee, and also on the Civil Service Committee and the Committee on Veterans' Affairs. She chaired the Committee on Veterans' Affairs from 1947 to 1948 and again from 1953 to 1954, during the 80th and 83rd Congresses. She was also the first woman to preside as Speaker pro tempore over the House of Representatives.

On the afternoon of December 13, 1932, Marlin Kemmerer perched on the gallery railing of the U.S. House of Representatives, waved a pistol, and demanded the right to speak.  As other representatives fled in panic, Reps. Rogers and Melvin Maas (R-MN) approached the would-be gunman.  Rogers had counseled shell-shocked veterans at Walter Reed Hospital; she looked up at Kemmerer and told the troubled young man, "You won't do anything." Maas, a Marine in WW I, stood next to Rogers and asked Kemmerer to throw down his pistol.  When he did so, he was apprehended by Congressman (R – NY, and future mayor of New York City) Fiorello H. La Guardia and an off-duty D.C. police officer.  Kemmerer was released a month later at the request of House members.

Legislator

Rogers was regarded as capable by her male peers and became a model for younger Congresswomen. Her trademark was an orchid or a gardenia on her shoulder. She was also an active legislator and sponsored more than 1,200 bills, over half on veteran or military issues. She voted for a permanent nurse corps in the Department of Veteran's Affairs, and benefits for disabled veterans and veterans of the Korean War.

In 1937 she sponsored a bill to fund the maintenance of the neglected Congressional Cemetery, even though her husband was placed at rest in their hometown. She opposed child labor, and fought for "equal pay for equal work" and a 48-hour workweek for women, though she believed a woman's first priority was home and family. She supported local economic autonomy; on April 19, 1934, she read a petition against the expanded business regulations of the New Deal, and all 1,200 signatures, into the Congressional Record. Rogers voted in favor of the Civil Rights Acts of 1957 and 1960.

Rogers was an advocate for the textile and leather industries in Massachusetts. She acquired funding for flood control measures in the Merrimack River basin, helped Camp Devens become Fort Devens, Massachusetts in 1931, and was responsible for many other jobs and grants in the state.

A confidential 1943 analysis of the House Foreign Affairs Committee by Isaiah Berlin for the British Foreign Office described Rogers as

German refugees
Rogers was one of the first members of Congress to speak out against Adolf Hitler's treatment of Jews. The expulsion of Jews from Germany without proper papers caused a refugee crisis in 1938, and after the Evian Conference failed to lift immigration quotas in the 38 participating nations, Edith Rogers co-sponsored the Wagner-Rogers Bill with Senator Robert F. Wagner. Introduced to the Senate on February 9, 1939, and to the House on February 14, it would have allowed 20,000 German Jewish refugees under the age of 14 to settle in the United States.

The bill was supported by religious and labor groups, and the news media, but was strongly opposed by patriotic groups who believed "charity begins at home". After rancorous 1938 elections in the House and Senate, Congress had turned conservative, and despite provisions requiring the children to be supported by private individuals and agencies, not public funds, organizations like the American Legion, the Daughters of the American Revolution, and the American Coalition of Patriotic Societies lined up against it. With rising nativism and antisemitism, economic troubles, and Congress asserting its independence, President Franklin Delano Roosevelt was unable to support the bill, and it failed.

WAAC

Women had served in the United States military before. In 1901, a female Nurse Corps was established in the Army Medical Department and in 1907 a Navy Nurse Corps was established. However, despite their uniforms the nurses were civilian employees with few benefits. They slowly gained additional privileges, including "relative ranks" and insignia in 1920, a retirement pension in 1926, and a disability pension if injured in the line of duty in 1926. Rogers voted to support the pensions.

The first American women enlisted into the regular armed forces were 13,000 women admitted into active duty in the Navy and Marines during World War I, and a much smaller number admitted into the Coast Guard. These "Yeomanettes" and "women Marines" primarily served in clerical positions. They received the same benefits and responsibilities as men, including identical pay, and were treated as veterans after the war. These women were quickly demobilized when hostilities ceased, and aside from the Nurse Corps, the soldiery became once again exclusively male. In contrast, the army clerks and "Hello Girls" who worked the telephones during World War I were civilian contractors with no benefits.

Rogers' volunteer work in World War I exposed her to the status of the women with the United States Army, and the much more egalitarian role of women in the British Army. With this inspiration and model, Edith Rogers introduced a bill to the 76th Congress in early 1941 to establish a Women's Army Auxiliary Corps (WAAC) during World War II. The bill was intended to free men for combat duty by creating a cadre of 25,000 noncombatant clerical workers. The bill languished in the face of strong opposition to women in the army, and indifference in the face of higher priorities like the lend-lease bill, price controls, and ramping up war production.

After the December 7, 1941 attack on Pearl Harbor, manpower shortages threatened as productivity increased. Rogers approached the Army Chief of Staff George Marshall, and with his strong support she reintroduced the bill to the 77th Congress with a new upper limit of 150,000 women, and an amendment giving the women full military status. The amendment was resoundingly rejected but the unamended bill passed, and on May 14, 1942, President Franklin Delano Roosevelt's signature turned "An Act to Establish the Women's Army Auxiliary Corps" into Public Law 77-554.

While "Auxiliaries", and thus not a part of the regular army, the WAACs were given food, clothing, housing, medical care, training, and pay. They did not receive death benefits, medical care as veterans, retirement or disability pensions, or overseas pay. They were given auxiliary ranks which granted no command authority over men, and also earned less than men with comparable regular army ranks, until November 1, 1942, when legislation equalized their remuneration. Since they were not regular army they were not governed by army regulations, and if captured, were not protected by international conventions regarding the treatment of prisoners of war (POWs).

On July 30, 1942, Public Law 77-554 created the WAVES (Women Accepted for Volunteer Emergency Service) in the Navy. The law passed with no significant opposition, despite granting the WAVES full status as military reserves, under the same Naval regulations that applied to men. The WAVES were granted equal pay and benefits, but no retirement or disability pensions and were restricted to noncombat duties in the continental United States. The similarly-empowered SPARS (from the motto Semper Paratus/"Always Ready") in the Coast Guard, and the Marine Corps Women's Reserve soon followed. The September 27, 1944, Public Law 78-441 allowed WAVES to also serve in Alaska and Hawaii.

The initial goal of 25,000 WAACs by June 30, 1943, was passed in November 1942. The goal was reset at 150,000, the maximum allowed by law, but competition from sister units like the WAVES and the private war industry, the retention of high educational and moral standards, underuse of skilled WAACs, and a spate of vicious gossip and bad publicity in 1943 prevented the goal from ever being reached.

The rumors of immoral conduct were widely published by the press without verification, and harmed morale. Investigations by the War Department and Edith Rogers uncovered nothing; and the incidence of disorderly and criminal conduct among the WAACs was a tiny fraction of that among the male military population, venereal disease was almost non-existent, and the pregnancy rate was far below civilian women. Despite this, the June 30, 1943, enlistment reached 60,000.

Women's Army Corps

Edith Rogers introduced a bill in October 1942 to make the WAACs a formal part of the United States Army Reserve. Fearing it would hinder other war legislation, George Marshall declined to support it and it failed. He changed his mind in 1943, and asked Congress to give the WAAC full military status. Experience showed that the two separate systems were too difficult to manage. Rogers and Oveta Culp Hobby, the first Director of the WAACs, drafted a new bill which was debated in the House for six months before passing. On July 1, 1943, Roosevelt signed "An Act to Establish the Women's Army Corps in the Army of the United States", which became Public Law 78-110. The "auxiliary" portion of the name was officially dropped, and on July 5, 1943, Hobby was commissioned as a full colonel, the highest rank allowed in the new Women's Army Corps.

The WACs received the same pay, allowances, and benefits as regular army units, though time spent as a WAC did not count toward time served and the allowance for dependents was heavily restricted. The WACs were now disciplined, promoted, and given the same legal protections as regular Army units, and the 150,000 ceiling was lifted. While the legislators made it very clear they expected the WACs to be noncombatants, the bill contained no specific restrictions. Existing Army regulations still prohibited them from combat training with weapons, tactical exercises, duty assignments requiring weapons, supervising men, and jobs requiring great physical strength, unless waived by the United States Secretary of War; but of the 628 Army specialties, women now qualified for 406. Additional Army regulations were adopted to cover pregnancy, marriage, and maternity care.

As part of the regular Army, WACs could not be permanently assigned as cooks, waitresses, janitors, or to any other civilian jobs. While most became clerks, secretaries, and drivers, they also became mechanics, weather observers, radio operators, medical technicians, intelligence analysts, chaplains, postal workers, and heavy equipment operators. The restriction against combat training and carrying weapons was waived in several cases, allowing women to serve as pay officers, military police, in code rooms, or as drivers in some overseas areas. On January 10, 1943, a 200-WAC unit was even trained as an antiaircraft gun crew, though they were not allowed to fire the 90 mm weapon. Several were also assigned to the Manhattan Project.

WACs also served overseas, and close to the front lines. During the invasion of Italy by the U.S. Fifth Army under Lieutenant General Mark W. Clark, a 60-woman platoon served in the advance headquarters, sometimes only a few miles from the front lines; and in the south Pacific WACs moved into Manila, Philippines only three days after occupation. By V-J Day, one fifth had served overseas.

On V-E Day, May 8, 1945, WACs reached their peak of 99,388 women in active duty, and a total of more than 140,000 WACs served during World War II. The majority served in the Army Service Forces, but large numbers also served as "Air WACs" in the Army Air Force, largely because of the enthusiastic and early support of General Henry H. Arnold, and in the Army Medical Corps. Only 2,000 served in the combat-heavy Army Ground Force.

Despite the noncombatant status of her directorate, Oveta Hobby was awarded the Distinguished Service Medal, the third-highest U.S. Army decoration and the highest one which can be awarded for non-combat service. The WACs were awarded a total of 62 Legions of Merit, 565 Bronze Stars, 3 Air Medals, and 16 Purple Hearts.

The initial bill called for the WACs to be discontinued 6 months after the President declared the war was at an end, but despite the resistance in the House and the smear campaign, the WACs performed capably and well. According to Dwight D. Eisenhower, "During the time I have had WACs under my command they have met every test and task assigned to them.... Their contributions in efficiency, skill, spirit, and determination are immeasurable." Douglas MacArthur called them "my best soldiers". With the rush to send as many men home as quickly as possible after the cessation of hostilities, WACs were even more in demand.

Supported by Eisenhower, the "Act to Establish a Permanent Nurse Corps of the Army and Navy and to Establish a Women's Medical Specialists Corps in the Army", or the Army-Navy Nurses Act of 1947, passed and became Public Law 8036, granting regular, permanent status to female nurses. Then in early 1946, Chief of Staff Eisenhower ordered legislation drafted to make the WACs a permanent part of the armed forces. The bill was unanimously approved by the Senate but the House Armed Forces Committee amended the bill to restrict women to reserve status, with only Representative Margaret Chase Smith dissenting.

After vehement objection by Eisenhower, who wrote "the women of America must share the responsibility for the security of their country in a future emergency as the women of England did in World War II"; the personal testimony of Secretary of Defense James Forrestal; and support from every major military commander including the Chief of Naval Operations Fleet Admiral Chester W. Nimitz, and MacArthur, the Commander of United States Army Forces in the Far East, who wrote, "we cannot ask these women to remain on duty, nor can we ask qualified personnel to volunteer, if we cannot offer them permanent status"; supporting articles in The New York Times and The Christian Science Monitor, and the support of Senator and future President Lyndon B. Johnson and Representative Edith Rogers, the amended bill passed in the House but was rejected in the Senate. A compromise restored the original wording but limited the total number of women allowed to serve for the first few years, which then passed regular army, which was submitted to Congress in 1947 in the midst of a massive reorganization of the unanimously in the Senate, and 206 to 133 in the House. On June 12, 1948, President Harry Truman signed the "Women's Armed Services Integration Act", making it Public Law 80-625.

On December 3, 1948, the Director of the WACs, Colonel Mary A. Hallaren, became the first commissioned female officer in the U.S. Army. The WACs still were not equal. They were limited in numbers, had no command authority over men, were restricted from combat training and duties, had additional restrictions on claiming dependents, and aside from their director, no woman could be promoted above the rank of lieutenant colonel. WACs served in the Korean and Vietnam Wars.

On November 8, 1967, Congress lifted the restriction on promotions, allowing the first WAC generals, and then, on October 29, 1978, the Women's Army Corps was disestablished and women were integrated into the rest of the Army.

G.I. Bill

In 1944, Edith Rogers helped draft, and then co-sponsored the G. I. Bill, with Representative John E. Rankin, and Senators Ernest McFarland, and Bennett Champ Clark. The bill provided for education and vocational training, low-interest loans for homes, farms, and businesses, and limited unemployment benefits for returning servicemen. On June 22, 1944, President Franklin D. Roosevelt signed "The Servicemen's Readjustment Act", which became Public Law 78-346 and handed her the first pen. As a result of the bill, roughly half of the returning veterans went on to higher education.

In August 2019, as part of the Forever GI Bill, the Edith Nourse Rogers Science Technology Engineering Math (STEM) Scholarship will be available to veterans pursuing STEM careers.  This scholarship will allow recipients to receive up to nine additional months Post-9/11 GI Bill benefits.

After World War II
During the cold war Rogers supported the House Committee on Un-American Activities and Senator Joseph McCarthy during the "Red Scare". Although she supported the United Nations, in 1953 she said that UN headquarters should be expelled from the U.S. if communist China were admitted. In 1954, she opposed sending U.S. soldiers to Vietnam.

Death and legacy
Edith Rogers died on September 10, 1960, at Philips House, Massachusetts General Hospital, in Boston, Massachusetts in the midst of her 19th Congressional campaign. She was interred with her husband in Lowell Cemetery, in their hometown of Lowell.

She received many honors during her life, including the Distinguished Service Medal of the American Legion in 1950. In honor of her work with veterans, the Edith Nourse Rogers Memorial Veterans Hospital in Bedford, Massachusetts bears her name.

The Women's Army Corps Museum (now the United States Army Women's Museum), established on May 14, 1955, in Fort McClellan, Alabama, was renamed the Edith Nourse Rogers Museum on August 18, 1961, but returned to its original name on May 14, 1977.

The E.N. Rogers Middle School in Lowell, Massachusetts is named after Edith Rogers. Among its famous graduates is former Congressman, and current chancellor of The University of Massachusetts Lowell, Marty Meehan, who served in the U.S. House of Representatives from January 5, 1993, to July 1, 2007. E.N. Rogers Middle School serves approximately 500 students in grades 5 through 8.

In 1998, Rogers was inducted into the National Women's Hall of Fame.

Governor Deval Patrick signed a Proclamation declaring June 30, 2012, as "Congresswoman Edith Nourse Rogers Day."

See also
List of United States Congress members who died in office (1950–99)
Women in the United States House of Representatives

References

Further reading
 Bellafaire, Judith A. "The Women's Army Corps: A commemoration of World War II service." United States Army Center of Military History publication 72-15. (brochure online)
 Brown, Dorothy M. (1999). "Edith Nourse Rogers: biographical sketch," eds John A. Garraty and Mark C. Carnes. American National Biography, volume 18. (paper online)
 Leventhal, Robert S. (2002). "'Believe the unbelievable': The American response to the Nazi genocide of the Jews, 1933–1945". Retrieved February 16, 2005.
 Morden, Bettie J. (1990). The Women's Army Corp, 1945–1978. United States Army Center of Military History publication 30-14. (book online)
 Synnott, Marcia G. "Edith Nourse Rogers." The Devens Historical Museum. Retrieved February 15, 2005.

External links
 
 Retrieved on 2008-02-17
Rogers, Edith Nourse, 1881-1960. Papers, 1854-1961: A Finding Aid. Schlesinger Library, Radcliffe Institute, Harvard University.

|-

|-

1881 births
1960 deaths
20th-century American politicians
American social workers
American women civilians in World War I
American women civilians in World War II
Female members of the United States House of Representatives
Military personnel from Maine
People from Saco, Maine
Republican Party members of the United States House of Representatives from Massachusetts
Women in Massachusetts politics
American expatriates in France
Politicians from Lowell, Massachusetts
20th-century American women politicians
American anti-communists